The Warsaw Praga County was a county of the Capital City of Warsaw, a voivodeship of the Second Polish Republic. It existed from 24 August 1928 to 1939.

History
It was established on 24 August 1928, from the part of the Warsaw County, as one of the counties of the Capital City of Warsaw, that functioned as the voivodeship of the Second Polish Republic. It ceased to exist in 1939, following the Invasion of Poland by Nazi Germany, and subsequent occupation of the county. As such, it was incorporated into then reestablished Warsaw County. In 1931, it had 176 100 inhabitants, and in 1939, it had an area of 43 km2.

See also
 Praga

Citations

Notes

References

States and territories established in 1928
States and territories disestablished in 1939
History of Warsaw
Former counties of Poland